Donbot, also known by its aliases Buzus and Bachsoy, is a botnet mostly involved in sending pharmaceutical and stock-based e-mail spam.

The Donbot botnet is thought to consist of roughly 125,000 individual computers, which combined send 800 million spam messages a day. This amount equals about 1.3% of the estimated total global spam volume of 230 billion messages a day, though the botnet has known spikes where it accounted for up to 4% of the total spam volume.

See also 
Malware
Internet crime
Internet security
Internet spam

References 

Internet security
Distributed computing projects
Spamming
Botnets